Strungout on Jargon is the debut studio album by post-punk band Death of Samantha, released March 1, 1986 on Homestead Records.

Release and reception 

Glenn Kenny of Trouser Press felt that Death of Samantha showed promise despite sounding too similar to other alternative groups of the era.

Track listing

Personnel 
Adapted from the Strungout on Jargon liner notes.

Death of Samantha
 Doug Gillard – guitar
 David James – bass guitar, piano
 John Petkovic – vocals, guitar, clarinet, design
 Steve-O – drums

Additional musicians and production
 Eruk Barth – saxophone
 Chris Burgess – mixing
 Death of Samantha – production
 Scott Hall – recording
 George Peckham – mastering
 Bob Richey – illustrations
 Steve Wainstead – photography

Release history

References 

1986 debut albums
Death of Samantha albums
Homestead Records albums